Thomas Everard may refer to:
Thomas Everard (mayor) (died 1781), mayor of Williamsburg, Virginia
Thomas Everard (Jesuit) (1560–1633), English Jesuit
Thomas-Everard family, a family of British farmers

See also
Everard (surname)